Helen Littleworth (born 23 April 1966) is a former New Zealand hockey and rugby union player. She captained New Zealand at the 1991 Women's Rugby World Cup.

Career 
Littleworth attended Wairarapa College. Before playing for the Black Ferns, she represented New Zealand in hockey from 1986 to 1988. She has a Diploma in Physiotherapy, a Post Graduate Diploma in Manipulative Physiotherapy and a Masters in Manipulative Physiotherapy from the University of Otago. She also has a coaching Diploma at Massey University.

In 1995, Littleworth was named University of Otago's Sportsperson of the Year. She is also the former coach of the University Women and Otago Spirit in the Farah Palmer Cup.

She has been the physiotherapist for the following teams:

 White Ferns
 Black Ferns (1998–2002)
 High Performance New Zealand
 New Zealand Para-athletics Olympics team at the 2016 Summer Paralympics.
 Athletics New Zealand (2006–2012)
 New Zealand Olympics Team at the 2008 and 2012 Summer Olympics.
 Team physiotherapist for the Commonwealth Games (2006, 2010)

References

External links
Black Ferns Profile

1966 births
Living people
New Zealand women's international rugby union players
New Zealand female rugby union players